The men's 3000 metres team event was part of the track and field athletics programme at the 1920 Summer Olympics. It was the second appearance of a 3000-metre team race event after the debut in 1912, but the fifth time that a team contest was arranged at the Olympics. The competition was held on Saturday, August 21, 1920, and on Sunday, August 22, 1920.

31 runners from six nations competed.

According to the International Olympic Committee medal database only the best three runners of each team were awarded with medals.

Results

Semifinals

Both semi-finals were held on Saturday, August 21, 1920.

Semifinal 1

Team result

Individual race result

Semifinal 2

Team result:

Individual race result:

Final

The final was held on Sunday, August 22, 1920.

Team result:

Individual race result:

References

 
 

Team race 3000 metres
1920